UPSE may refer to:

UP Stock Exchange
University of the Philippines School of Economics
Universidad Estatal Península de Santa Elena